The Campeonato Argentino de Rugby 1962 was won by the selection of Buenos Aires that beat in the final the selection of Unión de Rugby de Rosario.
For the first time the final was played outside of Buenos Aires in Rosario.

Rugby Union in Argentina in 1962 
 The Buenos Aires Champsionship was won by C.A.S.I.
 The Cordoba Province Championship was won by Universitario and Córdoba Athletic
 The North-East Championship was won by Tucumán RC

Preliminary 

 Ranking: 1. Rosario 2. Santa Fè

 Ranking: 1. Mar del Plata 2. Sur 3. Rio Negro y Neuquén

  Ranking 1. Cordoba 2. Norte 3. Valle De Lerma

Ranking: 1. Buenos Aires 2. Cuyo 3. San Juan

Semifinals 

Buenos Aires:  E. García, E. España, J. Orengo, J. Seaton, R. Abalos, A. Robson, 0. Aletta, W. Villar, J. Imhoff, A. Paván, M. Bouza, H. Ferraro, J. Gómez Kenny, J. Fernández Bussy, R. Esmondi. 
 Mar del Plata   :  O. Sastre, G. Beverino, E. Corbacho, L. Prieto, A. Verde, C. Alonso, R. Meyes, L. Ferrari, A. Salinas, E. Ferrari, C. Olivera, J. Biffaretti, 0. Arroyo, J. Casanegra, S. Vial. 

Buenos Aires:  F. Villamil, H. Goti, J. Queirolo, M. Molina, C. Blaksley, J. Lavayén, A. Etchegaray, D. Hogg, G. Montes de Oca, C. Álvarez, R. Schmidt, L. Varela, M. López Marti, H. Vidou, F. Álvarez. 
  Cordoba  :  H. Garutti, L. Rodríguez, E. Quetglas, J. Ramírez, J. Astrada, C. Feretti, J. Riciardello, R. Carballo, R. Loyola, E. Freguglia, J. Imas, A. González, R. Larrinaga, A. Gener, J. Cocco.

Final 

Rosario: E. García, R. Abalos, J. Orengo, J. Seaton, E. España, A. Robson (capt.), 0. Aletta, W. Villar, M. Paván, J. Imhoff, H. Ferraro, M. Bouza, R. Esmendi, F. Alonso, J. Gómez Kenny. 
 Buenos Aires :  F. Villamil, H. Goti, M. Molina Berro, J. Queirolo, C. Blaksley, J. Lavayén, E. González del Solar, C. Álvarez, R. Hogg (capt.), G. Montes de Oca, R. Schmidt, L. Varela, F. Álvarez, H. Vidou, M. López Martí.

External links 
 Memorias de la UAR 1962
 Rugby Archive

Campeonato Argentino de Rugby
Argentina
Campeonato